ARYZTA AG  is a food business based in Zurich with operations in Europe, Asia, Australia and New Zealand. It is incorporated in Switzerland and is listed on the SIX Swiss Exchange (the Zurich Stock Exchange). It discontinued its listing on Euronext Dublin on 1 March 2021. The group is a major supplier in the specialty frozen bakery sector, and is a global supplier of baked goods to the food service, retail and quick service restaurant sectors.

History
The company was founded as the Irish Co-Operative Agricultural Agency Society in January 1897 and renamed the Irish Agricultural Wholesale Society ('IAWS') in December 1897. It was first listed on the Irish Stock Exchange in 1988 and for most of the 1990s the company was managed by Philip Lynch, first as chief executive officer and later chairman. It bought Shamrock Foods in 1989, R&H Hall in 1990 and Cuisine de France in 1997. It went on to buy Delice de France in 1999, La Brea Bakery in 2001, Groupe Hubert in 2005 and Otis Spunkmeyer in 2006.

In June 2007, it spun off its agribusiness activities as Origin Enterprises plc. It merged with Hiestand Holding AG in August 2008 and, having changed its name to ARYZTA, commenced trading on the SIX Swiss Exchange and the Irish Stock Exchange on 22 August 2008. The new name derived from Latin arista, which referred to the apex or awn of a wheat grain.

It bought Honeytop Speciality Foods in September 2011.

In 2013, it acquired Klemme AG, a German manufacturer of frozen bakery products, for €280 million.

In 2014, ARYZTA acquired Pineridge Bakery in Canada and Cloverhill Bakery in the US for a total of €730 million.

In 2015, it acquired the Hungary-based Fornetti group which has operations in central and eastern European markets.

On February 1, 2018, ARYZTA announced that it had sold the Big Texas and Cloverhill brands to Hostess Brands.

As of August 2018, the company was struggling to cope with a heavy debt burden, a period of over-expansion, and a prolonged heat wave in Europe. Its market value fell from 6 billion euros in 2014 to 694 million euros in 2018.

Aryzta reduced its stake in the french frozen food company Picard Surgelés in October 2019, selling 43% of their stake to Groupe Zouari for €156 million.

In 2020, hedge fund Veraison attempted to unseat Aryzta's board of directors.

In 2021, London-based Lodbrok Capital LLP’s European Credit Opportunities Fund helped Aryzta stop a take-over bid from Elliott Management Corp.

Also in 2021, it sold off its Brazilian businesses (Aryzta do Brasil) to Grupo Bimbo.

In 2021, it sold off its North American holdings to private equity firm Lindsay Goldberg for $850 million.

In 2022, it more than doubled its bakery capacity in Malaysia through the acquisition of the bakery, equipment and associated land of De-Luxe Food Services from Envictus International Holdings.

Operations
ARYZTA is known for its Delice de France range of French-style bread-based products and its higher end of Artisan Breads available from La Brea Bakery. Other brands include Shamrock Foods, Cuisine de France and Hubert. Aryzta is particularly known for providing McDonald's burger buns. Aryzta operates 53 bakeries & kitchens across Europe, North America, South America, Asia, Australia and New Zealand. Aryzta refers to itself as one of the largest frozen bakery companies in the world.

References

External links
 

Food and drink companies of Switzerland
Manufacturing companies based in Zürich
Companies listed on the SIX Swiss Exchange
Food and drink companies established in 1897
1897 establishments in Ireland